UBP or Ubp may refer to:
 Ubon Ratchathani Airport, an airport near the city of Ubon Ratchathani, Thailand
 Ulusal Birlik Partisi, the National Unity Party of Northern Cyprus
 Unbipentium, symbol Ubp for 125, a theoretical chemical element
 Union Bancaire Privée, a private bank in Switzerland specializing in asset management
 United Bermuda Party, a political party
 Unnatural base pair, a DNA subunit that does not occur in nature
 Urstadt Biddle Properties, an American real estate company

See also
 UPB (disambiguation)